Marina Sergeyevna Akulova (born 13 December 1985 in Chelyabinsk) is a volleyball player from Russia, playing as a setter. She was a member of the Women's National Team that won the gold medal at the 2006 FIVB Women's World Championship.

Clubs
  Avtodor-Metar (2001-2004)
  Samorodok Khabarovsk (2004-2008)
  Omichka Omsk (2008-2012)

References
 FIVB Profile

1985 births
Living people
Russian women's volleyball players
Volleyball players at the 2008 Summer Olympics
Olympic volleyball players of Russia
Sportspeople from Chelyabinsk
20th-century Russian women
21st-century Russian women